The 1983 NCAA Division III Lacrosse Championship was the fourth annual tournament to determine the national champions of NCAA Division III men's college lacrosse in the United States.

The tournament field included eight teams, with the final played at Boswell Field at the Hobart and William Smith Colleges in Geneva, New York. 

Hosts and three-time defending champions Hobart defeated Roanoke in the final, 13–9, to win their fourth Division III national title.

Bracket

See also
1983 NCAA Division I Men's Lacrosse Championship
1983 NCAA Women's Lacrosse Championship

References

NCAA Division III Men's Lacrosse Championship
NCAA Division III Men's Lacrosse Championship
NCAA Division III Men's Lacrosse